Rio Hondo High School is a high school in Rio Hondo, Texas. It is a part of the Rio Hondo Independent School District.

Notable alumni

Roberto Garza: NFL player for the Atlanta Falcons and Chicago Bears

References

External links
 

Public high schools in Texas
Schools in Cameron County, Texas